Avarice, or greed, is an inordinate or insatiable longing for material gain.

Avarice may also refer to:

 Avarice (Dürer, Vienna), a 1507 painting by Albrecht Dürer
 Operation Avarice, a U.S. military operation
 "Avarice", a song by Disturbed from Ten Thousand Fists

See also
 Avaris, a place in ancient Egypt
 Averis, a surname